Abdikarim Adan Haji Diriye is a Somaliland politician and is the current Governor of Sool Region of Somaliland. He was appointed and assumed as the Governor of sool By The president of Somaliland HE Muse Bihi Abdi on 2 November 2021. He was the former Governor of Gebiley from 29 June 2020 to 2 November 2021.

Early life 
He was born in Maydh, the historic coastal town of sanaag region. He belongs to the Habar Yoonis sub-division of the Garhajis Isaaq clan.

References 

1975 births
Living people